The Jewish Communist Workers Youth Union (Iugend Poalei Zion) (in Russian; EKSRM (Iugend Poalei Zion)), initially known as the Jewish Socialist Workers Youth Union (Iugend Poalei Zion) (ESSRM (Iugend Poalei Zion)), was a Labour Zionist youth organization in Soviet Russia/Soviet Union. The organization was the youth wing of the Jewish Communist Labour Party (Poalei Zion). The All-Russian Constituent Conference of ESSRM (Iugend Poalei Zion) was held March 4–10, 1921 in Moscow. This conference was followed by the first All-Russian Congress of ESSRM (Iugend Poalei Tsion), held between August 15–20, 1922 in Moscow. The organization was active until 1928.

References

Poale Zion
Jewish communist movements
Youth wings of communist parties
Jews and Judaism in the Soviet Union
Youth organizations based in the Soviet Union
Labor Zionism
Secular Jewish culture in Europe
Zionism in Russia